William Wheatley Wagstaff (1880-1962) was a British sculptor, who was active in China from 1920 to 1946.

Biography
Wagstaff was a student of the Royal Academy Schools from 30 July 1907 to July 1910.

He joined the firm of 'Arts and Crafts' in Shanghai, China in 1920. He later opened his own sculpture, ornamental plaster and metal work studio and workshop in Shanghai.

References

External links

 Entry at London Remembers

1880 births
1962 deaths
20th-century English sculptors
Alumni of the Royal Academy Schools
British sculptors
British expatriates in China